Paramathi-Velur is a state assembly constituency in Tamil Nadu, India that was formed after constituency delimitations in 2008. Its State Assembly Constituency number is 95. It consists of Paramathi-Velur taluk and portions of the Tiruchengodu and Namakkal taluks. It forms a part of the Namakkal parliamentary constituency. It is one of the 234 State Legislative Assembly Constituencies in Tamil Nadu in India.

Election results

2021

2016

2011

References 

Assembly constituencies of Tamil Nadu
Namakkal district